Urban rail transit is an all-encompassing term for various types of local rail systems providing passenger service within and around urban or suburban areas. The set of urban rail systems can be roughly subdivided into the following categories, which sometimes overlap because some systems or lines have aspects of multiple types.

Types

Tram

A tram, streetcar, or trolley system is a rail-based transit system that runs mainly or completely along streets (with street running), with a relatively-low capacity and frequent stops. Passengers usually board at the street or curb level, but low-floor trams may allow level boarding. Longer-distance lines are called interurbans or radial railways. Few interurbans remain, most having been upgraded to commuter rail or light rail or abandoned.

The term "tram" is used in most parts of the world. In North America, such systems are referred to as "streetcar" or "trolley" systems. In Germany, such systems are called "Straßenbahn", which literally translates as "street train" or "street railway".

Updated tram systems have higher passenger capacities than traditional streetcars.

Light rail

A light rail system is a rail-based transit system that has higher capacity and speed than a tram, usually by operating in an exclusive right-of-way separated from automobile traffic, but it is not, unlike rapid transit, fully grade-separated from other traffic. Light rail also generally operates with multiple-units trains, rather than single tramcars. It emerged as an evolution of trams/streetcars. Light rail systems vary significantly in terms of speed and capacity and range from slightly-improved tram systems to systems that are essentially rapid transit but with some level crossings.

The term "light rail" is the most common term, but German systems are called "Stadtbahn", which translates to "city railway".

Rapid transit

A rapid transit system is a railway, usually in an urban area, with high passenger capacities and frequency of service and (usually) full grade separation from other traffic, including other rail traffic. It is often known as "heavy rail" to distinguish it from light rail and from bus rapid transit.

In most parts of the world, such systems are known as a "metro", short for "metropolitan", which is itself short for "Metropolitan Railway", the first such system in the world. The term "subway" is used in many American systems, as well as in Glasgow and in Toronto. The system in London is named the "Underground" and is commonly nicknamed the "tube". Systems in Germany are called "U-Bahn", which stands for Untergrundbahn ("underground rail"). Many systems in East, Southeast and South Asia like Taipei, Chennai and Singapore, are called "MRT", which stands for "mass rapid transit". Systems that are predominantly elevated may be referred to as "L", as in Chicago, or "Skytrain", as in Bangkok and Vancouver. Other less common names include "T-bane", which stands for "tunnelbana" (in Scandinavia, literally tunnel track) and "MTR" (mass transit railway).

Monorail

A monorail is a railway in which the track consists of a single rail, as opposed to the traditional track with two parallel rails.

Commuter rail

A commuter rail, regional rail or suburban rail system operates on mainline trackage, which may be shared with intercity rail and freight trains. Systems tend to operate at lower frequencies than rapid transit or light rail systems but tend to travel at higher speeds, have more widely spaced stations and cover longer overall distances. They have high passenger capacities per single train.

Though many European and East Asian commuter rail systems operate with frequencies and rolling stock similar to that of rapid transit, they do not qualify as such because they share tracks with intercity/freight trains, or they have at grade crossings. For example, S-trains are hybrid systems combining the characteristics of both rapid transit and commuter rail systems. Generally, S-trains share tracks with mainline passenger and freight trains, but the distances between stations and the service headway resemble metro systems.

AGT

Automated Guideway Transit systems tend to operate with medium passenger capacities.

Funicular

A funicular is a cable-driven inclined railway that uses the weight of descending cars to help pull the ascending cars up the slope.

Cable car

A cable car, in the context of mass transit, is a system using rail cars that are hauled by a continuously-moving cable that runs at a constant speed. Individual cars stop and start by releasing and gripping the cable as required. Cable cars are distinct from funiculars (whose cars are permanently attached to the cable) and cable railways (which are similar to funiculars but have rail vehicles that are attached and detached manually).

Classification issues

Transit agencies' names for lines do not necessarily reflect their technical categorization. For example, the Green Line in Boston is referred to as a subway although it is mostly made up of above-ground portions. Conversely, the Docklands Light Railway in London, C Line in Los Angeles, and some metro lines in China are referred to as "Light Rail" but qualify as rapid transit because they are fully grade-separated and provide a high frequency of service.

Many cities use names such as subway and elevated railway to describe their entire systems, even if they combine both methods of operation. Slightly less than half of the London Underground's tracks, for example, are actually underground. The New York City Subway also combines elevated and subterranean stations, and the Chicago "L" and the Vancouver SkyTrain use tunnels to run through central areas.

Other types of services

Guided bus

A bus shares many characteristics with light rail and trams but does not run on rails. Trolleybuses are buses that are powered from overhead wires. Vehicles that can travel both on rails and on roads have been tried experimentally but are not in common use. The term bus rapid transit is used to refer to various methods of providing faster bus services and the systems that use it have similar characteristics to light rail. Guided buses are buses capable of being steered by external means, usually on a dedicated track or roll way that excludes other traffic. Some cities experimenting with guided bus technologies, such as Nancy, have chosen to refer to them as 'trams on tires' (rubber-tired trams) and given them tram-like appearances.

Economics

In a 2006 article, the political scientist Ted Balaker and the urban planner Cecilia Juong Kim stated that public rail transit provides certain benefits for a community but also that the goals of policymakers are not often met. They also note some American economists claim that contrary to popular belief, rail transit has failed to improve the environment, serve the poor, or reduce highway congestion in the United States. They also claim economists are somewhat more optimistic about rail transit's impact on economic development.

See also

Passenger rail terminology
List of tram and light rail transit systems
List of town tramway systems
Streetcars in North America
List of North American light rail systems by ridership
Medium-capacity rail system
List of premetro systems
List of metro systems
List of automated train systems
List of North American rapid transit systems by ridership
List of rail transit systems in North America
List of monorail systems
List of suburban and commuter rail systems
List of United States commuter rail systems by ridership
List of funicular railways
List of bus rapid transit systems
List of United States local bus agencies by ridership
List of trolleybus systems
List of airport people mover systems
Lists of rapid transit systems

References

Further reading
 "Electric Railway Transportation", Annals of the American Academy of Political and Social Science (January 1911) 37 (1): 1–202 – 17 articles by experts in 1911.

Electric rail transport
Light rail
Passenger rail transport